Many ships of the French Navy have borne the name Audacieux or Audacieuse, which means audacious in French, including: 

 , a frigate built at Dunkerque, later a commerce raider, then coastguard vessel, and struck 1707
 , a Téméraire-class 74-gun ship of the line, broken up in 1803
 , a gunboat in service until retired in 1814
 French ship Audacieux, a Téméraire-class 74-gun ship of the line, ordered in 1805 but completed in 1807 as Pultusk
 , an Ardente-class frigate, broken up in 1872

See also
 , a French fishing vessel in service 1945–50s
 List of ships named Audacious

French Navy ship names